Jean-Michel Blanquer (born 4 December 1964) is a French jurist and government official serving as Minister of National Education under Prime Ministers Édouard Philippe and Jean Castex from 2017 to 2022.

Education and early career 
Born in the 8th arrondissement of Paris, he obtained a doctorate in law from Panthéon-Assas University and a master's degree in politics from Sciences Po. From 1996 to 1998, he was a professor in civil law at Sciences Po Lille. From 1998 to 2004, he was director of the Institute of Latin American Studies at the New Sorbonne University.

From 2009 to 2012, Blanquer served as the director general of secondary and junior school education under then Minister of National Education Luc Chatel. In 2013, he became president of ESSEC Business School.

Minister of National Education 
On 15 May 2017, Blanquer was appointed by President Emmanuel Macron to be Minister of National Education in the first Philippe government. He retained the position on 17 June 2017 when the second Philippe government was formed, following the legislative election of 2017.

Soon after assuming the office, Blanquer announced plans to get rid of homework, preferring instead that time be set aside during the school day to do homework in school. He also overhauled the French baccalaureate and introduced free breakfasts for school children in poor neighborhoods. In June 2017, the ministry published a readjustment of elementary school programs in French and mathematics.

In December 2017, Blanquer announced that France's education system would ban mobile devices during lunch or recess. The announcement was met with mixed responses.

In early 2021, Blanquer removed himself from the race to lead the LREM campaign in Île-de-France during that year's regional elections and to potentially succeed Valérie Pécresse as president of the Regional Council of Île-de-France.

In addition to his government role, Blanquer has been heading the Le Laboratoire de la République since 2021; the organization is a think tank tasked with countering wokeism. He joined the law faculty of Paris 2 Panthéon-Assas_University in 2022 as professor of civil law.

2022 legislative election 
In the 2022 French legislative election, he stood in Loiret's 4th constituency but came third, and was eliminated in the first round.

Personal life
Blanquer has been divorced twice.

References

External link

1964 births
Living people
La République En Marche! politicians
Politicians from Paris
Collège Stanislas de Paris alumni
Pantheon-Sorbonne University alumni
Paris 2 Panthéon-Assas University alumni
Sciences Po alumni
Chevaliers of the Légion d'honneur
20th-century French politicians
21st-century French politicians
French Ministers of National Education
French academic administrators